Adam Mohsin Yehya Saleh (Arabic: ادم محمد يحيى صالح  ; born June 4, 1993) is an American YouTuber and boxer.

Early life
Adam Saleh was born in Brooklyn, New York City, on June 4, 1993, to Yemeni parents. He went to Manhattan Center For Science and Mathematics High School for three years, but transferred to Al-Madinah School after being expelled for hitting his dean's computer as a response to him allegedly making racist remarks towards his mother.

His main career aspiration was to become a lawyer. Saleh's uncle had died from a car accident just a few days before his cousin's wedding. Saleh describes his uncle as a very happy person and was an important member of his family and when he died in such circumstances it left their family in grief. The way his uncle had died had left an emotional scar as Saleh's has stated in the past that it's one of the reasons why he does not have a drivers license.

YouTube career

TrueStoryASA 
Saleh started making YouTube videos in 2012 as a part of his YouTube channel "TrueStoryASA" with his high school friends Abdullah Ghuman and Sheikh Akbar. His main career aspiration was to become a lawyer. He gained nationwide popularity when he appeared on The Ellen DeGeneres Show for his dancing antics. The day his Ellen show appearance was to happen, he had a final test, but chose to go on Ellen; he later described this as the turning point in his career as a full-time YouTuber. Saleh first released the single "Diamond Girl" on May 3, 2015, featuring Sheikh Akbar and Mumzy Stranger as a part of TrueStoryASA. On August 16, 2015, he released his debut solo single, "Tears" featuring Zack Knight, as a tribute to his cousin and his uncle. After TrueStoryASA ended, Saleh took over both the main and vlog channels and renamed them "Adam Saleh" and "Adam Saleh Vlogs". There was controversy about why the groups had split up. Some rumors say the problem was between Saleh and Akbar, and many of Saleh's fans blame his manager for the split. In September 2017, Saleh released his debut album called Chapter II featuring collaborations with many artists, including "Waynak" (with Faydee),"Tsunami","All About Love", "The Motto" (with Kennyon Brown), and "All You Can Handle" (with Demarco). On February 18, 2018, he accepted the challenge to be KSI's next boxing opponent.

3MH channel 
Saleh became part of another collaborative channel, "3MH" with Sheikh Akbar, Karim Metwaly, and Slim Albaher. 3MH split up in May 2015. Since then he has created many videos as a solo YouTuber.

Boxing career

Amateur and exhibition career

Saleh vs Stephenson 
On September 29, 2019, Saleh fought British amateur boxer Marcus Stephenson in a charity event for Yemen at the York Hall in London, England. Saleh won via unanimous decision. Saleh's then manager and Stephenson both later stated the fight was rigged and that Stephenson agreed to lose for a cash sum.

Saleh vs Sharks 
On July 30, 2021, Saleh fought Iraqi TikToker Walid Sharks as the co-feature bout on the first Social Knockout event at the Coca-Cola Arena in Dubai, UAE. The bout ended in a majority draw. Controversies rose as many questioned how the bout ended as a draw including popular YouTuber FaZe Sensei who stated "it's mathematically impossible for the fight to end in a draw" seeing as the bout was only three rounds.

Saleh vs Elshayib 
On October 15, Saleh fought Jordanian Influencer Anas Elshayb on the second Social Knockout event at the Coca-Cola Arena in Dubai, UAE. Saleh won via unanimous decision.

Professional career

Saleh vs. McBroom 
On September 10, 2022, Saleh made his professional debut against American YouTuber Landon McBroom, younger brother of Austin McBroom, at the Banc of California Stadium in Los Angeles California, U.S. for the ICB International middleweight belt. The bout ended in a unanimous draw.

Saleh vs Kellogg 
Saleh faced American TikToker Stuart Kellogg, also known as Evil Hero, on February 26, 2023, at Diriyah Arena in Diriyah, Saudi Arabia. Saleh won via RTD due to Kellogg suffering an arm injury.

Controversies
A staged video titled "Racial Profiling Experiment'" uploaded on Saleh's YouTube channel in October 2014 became popular around the world. In the video, Saleh and Sheikh Akbar argued with each other in front of a police officer wearing western outfits but the cop ignored them. Shortly thereafter, they fight again while dressed in traditional clothes but this time the cop stops them and behaves rudely with them. The video received more than 200,000 views on YouTube and it was also picked up by media. Public reaction to the video was against the police officer. Later Saleh said that the video was staged to recreate "previous events that occurred", and it was being shown as an example to others about how these things can happen to people on the streets only if they are dressed in a 'different' way. The New York chapter of the Council on American–Islamic Relations (CAIR), which had previously tweeted out the video as an example of discrimination against Muslims, demanded an apology from Saleh and Akbar stating "Muslims are already under the microscope and to do this just to gain some cheap publicity is totally unacceptable. There should be no attempt to justify it; they should just apologize and ask people to forgive them for their irresponsible actions."

In another YouTube video, Saleh claimed to have flown inside a suitcase in the baggage hold on a Tigerair flight from Melbourne to Sydney. However, Melbourne Airport security footage proved the incident was a hoax after they produced video showing Saleh boarding the plane with the airline noting that a bag of his weight would not be loaded on the plane without investigation nor would a passenger in the plane's unheated cargo hold emerge sweating.

In 2018, Saleh, as well as other YouTubers, were involved in a BBC Trending investigation for promoting the website EduBirdie, which lets users buy essays (promoting cheating).

Delta flight controversy 
In December 2016, Saleh claimed he was removed from a Delta Air Lines flight at Heathrow Airport for speaking Arabic. However, other passengers have spoken out, claiming that Saleh was disturbing other passengers, and Delta's own statement said that Saleh was shouting and provoking others. Saleh's manager also stated this, explaining that Saleh did not sue the airline. Saleh's claim has caused a debate over the "Right to Fly".

Boxing record

Professional

Exhibition

Amateur

Discography

Studio albums

Singles

As lead artist

As a featured artist

References

External links
 
 
  – Vlogs

Living people
American Muslims
American YouTubers
Musicians from Brooklyn
American people of Yemeni descent
American hip hop singers
1993 births
YouTube vloggers
YouTube boxers
Prank YouTubers
Arab YouTubers